Edgerton is an unincorporated community in Jackson Township, Allen County, in the U.S. state of Indiana.

History
Edgerton was founded in 1889 after the railroad was extended to that point. A post office was established at Edgerton in 1890, and remained in operation until it was discontinued in 1954.

Edgerton was named for Joseph K. Edgerton. He was born in Vergennes, Vermont in 1818 and moved to Fort Wayne in 1844. A lawyer and politician, he invested in large parcels of land in Ohio, and also along the Ohio line in Indiana, in townships east of Fort Wayne. There, he had purchased what was considered condemned swamp land which still had stands of virgin timber because it was too wet and difficult to do logging. Two Anspach brothers - John, and George - from Oak Harbor, Ohio, purchased several hundred acres of that land from Mr. Edgerton's estate, managed by his sons Edward and Clement.

The Anspach brothers built homes, a sawmill, a tile factory, and a general store there, naming the new village for Mr. Edgerton. The tile factory produced drainage tile that was utilized to drain the swampy land to facilitate its clearing and occupation. Their brother Allen Anspach and other siblings remained in Oak Harbor, where he ran the family's existing lumber company. The Edgerton house built by George Anspach is still an active residence there, facing the railroad tracks. His daughter, Edith, was born in Oak Harbor about 1881, and occupied the house after her marriage to George Waldrop, of Owen County, KY who had come there to find work during the depression following the Spanish–American War. George Anspach and wife Mary moved to Creighton Avenue in Fort Wayne around 1908, leaving the Edgerton house to Edith and her husband George. Edith and George Waldrop then also moved to another residence on Creighton Avenue around 1918. About half of their ten children were born in Edgerton, half in Fort Wayne.

Geography

References

Unincorporated communities in Allen County, Indiana
Unincorporated communities in Indiana
Fort Wayne, IN Metropolitan Statistical Area